Zendon Alphonso Hamilton (born April 29, 1975) is an American professional basketball coach and former player. He played in the National Basketball Association (NBA) from 2000 to 2006.

Amateur career
Hamilton, a 6'11" center played high school basketball at Floral Park, New York's Sewanhaka High School.  Hamilton played college basketball at St. John's University, where he was a part of the same recruiting class as Sports Illustrated cover boy Felipe López.

Pro career
After two seasons in Europe, Hamilton began his NBA career in the 2000–01 NBA season with the Los Angeles Clippers.  He had previously played with the Dallas Mavericks in the NBA pre-season in 1999, but he did not play in any official NBA games with Dallas. He has also played for the Denver Nuggets, the Toronto Raptors, the Philadelphia 76ers, the Milwaukee Bucks, and the Cleveland Cavaliers. He was signed on October 1, 2006, by the Portland Trail Blazers, but after the pre-season he was waived on October 25, 2006, without playing any regular season games with the club.

In February 2007, he joined Śląsk Wrocław. In the summer of 2007, he moved to Russia and signed with Enisey Krasnoyarsk. In 2008, he joined Spartak Primorje. In 2010, he joined Polytekhnika-Halychyna Lviv. In 2012, he joined Larre Borges of Uruguay.

NBA career statistics

Regular season

|-
| align="left" | 2000–01
| align="left" | Los Angeles
| 3 || 0 || 6.3 || .222 || .000 || .625 || 2.7 || 0.0 || 0.0 || 0.0 || 3.0
|-
| align="left" | 2001–02
| align="left" | Denver
| 54 || 15 || 15.7 || .420 || .000 || .652 || 4.7 || 0.3 || 0.4 || 0.3 || 6.0
|-
| align="left" | 2002–03
| align="left" | Toronto
| 3 || 0 || 4.0 || .400 || .000 || 1.000 || 1.3 || 0.0 || 0.3 || 0.0 || 2.0
|-
| align="left" | 2003–04
| align="left" | Philadelphia
| 46 || 0 || 10.3 || .537 || .000 || .698 || 3.2 || 0.3 || 0.2 || 0.2 || 3.7
|-
| align="left" | 2004–05
| align="left" | Milwaukee
| 16 || 0 || 9.9 || .344 || .000 || .604 || 2.6 || 0.4 || 0.3 || 0.1 || 3.2
|-
| align="left" | 2005–06
| align="left" | Cleveland
| 11 || 0 || 4.2 || .538 || .000 || .688 || 1.0 || 0.0 || 0.3 || 0.0 || 2.3
|-
| align="left" | 2005–06
| align="left" | Philadelphia
| 1 || 0 || 3.0 || .000 || .000 || .500 || 0.0 || 0.0 || 1.0 || 0.0 || 1.0
|- class="sortbottom"
| style="text-align:center;" colspan="2"| Career
| 134 || 15 || 11.6 || .440 || .000 || .660 || 3.5 || 0.2 || 0.3 || 0.2 || 4.4
|}

Coaching
In October 2013, Hamilton was hired by the Idaho Stampede as an assistant coach for the 2013–14 season.

On October 18, 2016, Hamilton was hired by the Texas Legends to be an assistant coach.

Hamilton joined the Agua Caliente Clippers as an assistant coach in 2018.

References

External links
NBA.com Player Bio
NBA Player Stats

1975 births
Living people
Agua Caliente Clippers coaches
American expatriate basketball people in Canada
American expatriate basketball people in Greece
American expatriate basketball people in Poland
American expatriate basketball people in Russia
American expatriate basketball people in Spain
American expatriate basketball people in Syria
American expatriate basketball people in Ukraine
American expatriate basketball people in Uruguay
American men's basketball players
Basketball coaches from New York (state)
Basketball players from New York City
BC Enisey players
BC Politekhnika-Halychyna players
BC Spartak Primorye players
CB Valladolid players
Centers (basketball)
Cleveland Cavaliers players
Dafnis B.C. players
Denver Nuggets players
Greek Basket League players
Idaho Stampede coaches
Joventut Badalona players
Liga ACB players
Los Angeles Clippers players
McDonald's High School All-Americans
Milwaukee Bucks players
Parade High School All-Americans (boys' basketball)
People from Floral Park, New York
Philadelphia 76ers players
Power forwards (basketball)
Śląsk Wrocław basketball players
Sportspeople from Nassau County, New York
Sportspeople from Queens, New York
Springfield Armor players
St. John's Red Storm men's basketball players
Texas Legends coaches
Toronto Raptors players
Undrafted National Basketball Association players
Yakima Sun Kings players